Odontionopa is a genus of leaf beetles in the subfamily Eumolpinae. It is distributed in Africa.

Species
Species in the genus include:

Odontionopa caerulea 
Odontionopa chloris 
Odontionopa dentata 
Odontionopa discolor 
Odontionopa sericea

References

Eumolpinae
Chrysomelidae genera
Taxa named by Louis Alexandre Auguste Chevrolat
Beetles of Africa